Protest is an EP by The Dears, released in limited quantities in 2002. It was later re-released in a mass market version with different artwork in 2004. The EP was also included as a bonus disc in the Australian release of No Cities Left.

Track listing

(2002 release)
 "Heaven, Have Mercy on Us" – 3:56
 "Summer of Protest" – 7:01
 "No Hope Before Destruction" – 6:33

(2004 release)
 "Heaven, Have Mercy on Us" – 3:56
 "Summer of Protest" – 7:01
 "No Hope Before Destruction" – 6:33
 "Protest (Parallel)" – 11:50 (remix and additional production by chaonaut)

2002 EPs
The Dears albums